Anthills of the Savannah is a 1987 novel by Nigerian writer Chinua Achebe. It was his fifth novel, first published in the United Kingdom 21 years after Achebe's previous one (A Man of the People in 1966), and was credited with having "revived his reputation in Britain". A finalist for the 1987 Booker Prize for Fiction, Anthills of the Savannah has been described as the "most important novel to come out of Africa in the [1980s]". Critics praised the novel upon its release.

Plot
Anthills of the Savannah takes place in the imaginary West African country of Kangan, where a Sandhurst-trained officer, identified only as Sam and known as "His Excellency", has taken power following a military coup. Achebe describes the political situation through the experiences of three friends: Chris Oriko, the government's Commissioner for Information; Beatrice Okoh, an official in the Ministry of Finance and girlfriend of Chris; and Ikem Osodi, a newspaper editor critical of the regime. Other characters include Elewa, Ikem's girlfriend, and Major "Samsonite" Ossai, a military official known for stapling hands with a Samsonite stapler. Tensions escalate through the novel, culminating in the assassination of Ikem by the regime, the toppling and death of Sam and finally the murder of Chris. The book ends with a non-traditional naming ceremony for Elewa and Ikem's month-old daughter, organized by Beatrice.

Reception
The novel was well received by critics. Charles Johnson, writing for The Washington Post, praised the book, but faulted Achebe for failing to fully flesh out his characters. Nadine Gordimer praised the book's humor, particularly when contrasted against its depictions of horrors.

References

External links

 D. A. N. Jones, "Powerful People" (review), London Review of Books, Vol. 9, No. 18, 15 October 1987, pp. 24–25.
 Charles Johnson, "‘Anthills of the Savannah’ by Chinua Achebe" (review), The Washington Post, 22 March 2013; reprinted from 7 February 1988.

Novels by Chinua Achebe
1987 Nigerian novels
Novels set in Africa
Nigerian English-language novels
Heinemann (publisher) books
Novels set in fictional countries